= Zack Ruhl =

Crossfit athlete and double amputee

Zackery Clay Ruhl better known as Zack is a personal fitness trainer from Texas. He was born with a medical condition which led to requirement of amputation of his both legs at the age of 2.
